"So Alive" is a song by British alternative rock band Love and Rockets, released in 1989 as the second single from their self-titled fourth album. The song reached  1 in Canada and charted within the top 30 in the United States, Australia, and New Zealand. In the US, it topped the Billboard Modern Rock Tracks chart for five weeks and was ranked No. 1 on that listing's year-end chart for 1989. The song's music video was directed by Howard Greenhalgh and produced by Pamela James.

Critical reception
Billboard magazine described "So Alive" as "delectable" as well as the "best T. Rex tune that Marc Bolan never wrote." Ned Raggett of AllMusic wrote that the song was the only track on the album capable of receiving airplay and also noted the T. Rex similarities.

Chart performance
The single was Love and Rockets' biggest hit in the United States, peaking at No. 3 on the Billboard Hot 100 and No. 1 on the Billboard Modern Rock Tracks chart, where it stayed for five weeks, as well as achieving a peak of No. 9 on the Billboard Album Rock Tracks chart. It was the most successful modern rock song of 1989 in the United States, ranking in at No. 1 on the chart's year-end edition. The song peaked at No. 1 on Canada's RPM Top Singles chart for two weeks, finishing 1989 as Canada's sixth-best-performing single. "So Alive" also reached No. 79 on the UK Singles Chart, No. 24 on the Australian Singles Chart, and No. 16 on the New Zealand Singles Chart.

Track listings

UK, US, and Canadian 7-inch single
A. "So Alive" – 4:18 (4:15 in North America)
B. "Dreamtime" – 8:42 (8:40 in North America)

European and Australasian 7-inch single
A. "So Alive" – 4:15
B. "Bike" – 3:56 (3:46 in Australasia)

UK CD single
 "So Alive" – 3:48
 "Dreamtime" – 8:42
 "Motorcycle" – 3:32
 "Bike" – 3:46

Charts

Weekly charts

Year-end charts

See also
 List of Billboard number-one alternative singles of the 1980s

References

1989 singles
1989 songs
Beggars Banquet Records singles
British dance-pop songs
Funk rock songs
Love and Rockets (band) songs
Music videos directed by Howard Greenhalgh
RCA Records singles
RPM Top Singles number-one singles
Songs written by Daniel Ash